Many films, television and comic book adaptation has been made with Sunil Gangopadhyay's Kakababu character. Here are the list of some other media adaptation.

Films

Sabuj Dwiper Raja (1979)

This is the first feature film based on Kakababu, which is directed by Tapan Sinha. Kakababu was played by Samit Bhanja and Shontu was played by Arunavo Adhikari.

Kakababu Here Gelen? (1995)

Directed by Pinaki Chaudhuri, Kakababu and Shontu's character was played by Sabyasachi Chakrabarty and Arghya Chakraborty respectively.

Ek Tukro Chand (2001)

Directed by Pinaki Chaudhuri, this film is the sequel to 1996 film Kakababu Here Gelen?. Kakababu's role was reprised by Sabyasachi Chakrabarty and Shontu's character was portrayed by Soham Chakraborty.

Mishawr Rawhoshyo (2013)

Directed by Srijit Mukherji, based on the novel of same name. Kakababu and Shontu's character was played by Prosenjit Chatterjee and Aryann Bhowmik respectively. Director Srijit Mukherji said this is the first film of a trilogy film series.

Yeti Obhijaan (2017)

After Mishawr Rawhoshyo, while the makers were planning about the sequel, Director Srijit Mukherji told about next Kakababu film to The Telegraph: "We’ve planned three. Actually I wanted to make a trilogy — a desert, a mountain and a jungle. The desert is done. Most probably we’re looking at mountain after this, which could be Kakababu Bajra Lama, Paharchuray Aatonko or Bhayankar Sundor. One in Sikkim, one in the basecamp of the Everest, kind of a difficult shoot, and Kashmir, also a difficult shoot".

In December 2014, director Srijit Mukherji said: "Yes, it's Paharchuray Aatonko next. Since we'll be shooting in the mountains, summer is the best time. We'll start in May and wrap up by June, before it begins to rain. The shoot is going to be difficult, as the actors will have to be hand-in-glove with mountaineering. I've spoken to Bumbada ( Prosenjit Chatterjee) about the dates. DoP Soumik Halder's dates have also been locked".

Kakababur Protyaborton (2022)

This film was shot in the forest based on Jongoler Modhye Ek Hotele. It is released on 4 February 2022.

Television series

Live-action

Khali Jahajer Rahasya (1999)
Directed by Surojit Sengupto aired on DD Bangla as a 13 episodes TV Series. In Khali Jahajer Rahasya, Kakababu was played by Sabyasachi Chakrabarty as usual. Shontu was played by Bijoyesh Chakrabarty and Biman was played by Tota Roy Chowdhury.

Kakababu O Ek Chadmabeshi (2001)
Directed by Joy Mukherjee aired on ETV Bangla. Kakababu was played by Arjun Chakraborty and Shontu was played by Sumon Banerjee.

Kakababu Firey Elen (2008-2009)
Based on the Novel Kolkatar Jongoley, the screenplay devised and directed by Subrata Das, screenplay by- Aditi Mazumder, Anuja Chattopadhyay and Subrata Das. Aired on DD Bangla. Cast: Sudip Mukherjee as Kakababu, Debshankar Haldar as Rajkumar, Saheb Bhattacharya as Santu, Nabonita Dey as Debolina, Taranga Sarkar as Jojo, Arnab Bhadra as Biman and Rajatava Dutta as Mr. Mallick.

Animated

Kakababu-Sontu (2010)
In October'2010 onwards Ruposhi Bangla channel has started Kakababu-Sontu as animation series first time ever in Bangla Entertainment. Animated avatar of Kakababu & Sontu visited Egypt (Mishor Rohosyo) to solve a mystery related to a mummy hidden below a pyramid. Then they went to Kashmir (Mission Kashmir aka Bhoyonkor Sundor) in the search of the lost head of King Konishko's statue. Later on they headed towards Andaman to solve the famous mystery of Sobuj Dwip. In this adventure both ex-chief minister Buddhadeb Bhattacharjee and Chief Minister Mamata Banerjee was seen in their animation avatar. In January 2011 Kakababu solved the mystery of Kein Shipton and a group of mysterious Yeti (Paharchuray Aatonko) and then he went to Africa to solve the case of some missing persons from a particular hotel (Bhoyonkor Africa aka Jongoler Modhye Ek Hotel). In March'2011, Sontu's friend Jojo is introduced in the adventure Bijoynogorer Hire but then in April'2011, when Kakababu faced Bozrolama (Bozrolama Rahasya) he takes only Sontu with him. After Bozrolama, he will confront Chondondossu in a dense forest of Kornatok (Chondondossur Mukhomukhi) and the illustration of Chondondossu reminds us none but notorious Mr Veerappan.
Channel Ruposhi Bangla telecasts Sontu-Kakababu Animation Serial every Sunday at 9.30am. And A Complete Kakababu-Sontu Animation Movie on EVERY SUNDAY at 11.30am.
Release date of Kakababu-Sontu animation adventure
October’2010 Mishor Rohosyo
November’2010 Mission Kashmir
December’2010 Sobuj Dwiper Raja
January’2011 Paharchuray Atonko
February’2011 Bhoyonkor Africa
March’2011 Bijoynogorer Heere
April’2011 Bozrolama Rohosyo
May’2011 Chondondosyur Mukhomukhi

Telefilms

Rajbarir Rahashya
In this telefilm Kakababu's character was played by Sumanta Mukherjee.

Kolkatar Jongoley
Sumanta Chatterjee reprised the role of Kakababu.

Cast and characters

Comics

Art by Bijon Karmakar, published by Ananda Publishers:

 Bhoyonkor Sundor.
 Kolkatar Jongoley.

See also
Feluda
Feluda in other media
Byomkesh Bakshi
Byomkesh Bakshi in other media
Tarini khuro
Tarini Khuro in other media

References

External links
Sabuj Dwiper Raja at the Internet Movie Database
Mishawr Rawhoshyo at the Internet Movie Database

Indian detective films
Films based on Indian novels
Television shows based on Indian novels
Indian adventure films